Kjerringvika or Kjerringvik is a village located in the municipality of Inderøy in Trøndelag county, Norway.

The village is located along the Norwegian County Road 755 at the western end of the Skarnsund Bridge.  The bridge was built in 1991 to replace the old Vangshylla–Kjerringvik Ferry which was in service from 1958–1991.  The first six years of service also included a ferry connection to the town of Levanger. In 1991, the ferry service was replaced by the Skarnsund Bridge. The old ferry quay has since been taken into use as a tug boat base.

References

Villages in Trøndelag
Ferry quays in Trøndelag
Mosvik
Inderøy